This page, one list of hereditary baronies, lists all baronies, extant, extinct, dormant, abeyant, or forfeit, in the Peerage of the United Kingdom.



George III (1801–1811)

Regency (1811–1820)

George IV (1820–1830)

William IV (1830–1837)

Victoria (1837–1901)

Edward VII (1901–1910)

George V (1910–1936)

Edward VIII (1936)

George VI (1936–1952)

Elizabeth II (1952–2022)

See also
List of Baronies in the Peerage of England
List of Lordships of Parliament
List of Baronies in the Peerage of Great Britain
List of Baronies in the Peerage of Ireland
List of Life Peerages
List of Law Life Peerages
Pre-1876 Life Peerages

References

United Kingdom
Barons
Baronies